Joe Viola is a writer, producer and director of films and TV, best known for his work in television and exploitation films.

He started in the industry as a director of TV commercials produced by his friend Jonathan Demme. They made several films for Corman together.

Select credits
 Angels Hard as They Come (1971) - director
 The Hot Box (1972) - writer, director
Black Mama White Mama (1973) - original story
 T.J. Hooker - story editor
 Cagney and Lacey - story editor

References

External links
 

Living people
Year of birth missing (living people)
Place of birth missing (living people)
American television producers
American television directors
American film producers
American film directors